The 1999 Fylde Borough Council election took place on 6 May 1999 to elect members of Fylde District Council in Lancashire, England. The whole council was up for election and the council stayed under no overall control.

Election result

|}

References

1999 English local elections
1999
1990s in Lancashire